Hypnotica is the debut studio album by Italian DJ and producer Benny Benassi which was released in 2003. The band was titled as Benny Benassi Presents the Biz, where the Biz are the singers Paul French and Violeta. It reached the top five in the French Album charts and left the top 20 after a month. For Hypnotica, Benassi mixes 1980s styles with his electronic music. He is considered a pioneer in electro house, largely because of Hypnotica, as it incorporates both sounds found in electroclash and many elements of house music into a consistent and successful album. Multiple singles were released from the album, such as "Satisfaction", "No Matter What You Do", "Love Is Gonna Save Us" and "Able to Love".

Track listing

Charts

Weekly charts

Year-end charts

Certifications

References

2003 debut albums
Benny Benassi albums
European Border Breakers Award-winning albums